Craig Morgan is an Irish hurler who plays for Tipperary Senior Championship club Kilruane MacDonagh's and at inter-county level with the Tipperary senior hurling team.

Career
Morgan made his senior debut for Tipperary on 25 January 2020 when he came on as a substitute in the opening round of the 2020 National Hurling League against Limerick in a 0-18 to 2-14 defeat.
He made his championship debut on 17 April 2022, starting against Waterford in the opening round of the 2022 Munster Hurling Championship.

Honours
All-Ireland Under-21 Hurling Championship (2): 2018, 2019 (c)
Munster Under-20 Hurling Championship (1): 2019 (c)

References

Living people
Tipperary inter-county hurlers
Year of birth missing (living people)